Mayer Amschel Rothschild (23 February 1744 – 19 September 1812; also spelled Anschel) was a German-Jewish banker and the founder of the Rothschild banking dynasty. Referred to as a "founding father of international finance", Rothschild was ranked seventh on the Forbes magazine list of "The Twenty Most Influential Businessmen of All Time" in 2005.

Early life
Mayer Amschel Rothschild was born in 1744 to an Ashkenazi Jewish family, in the Judengasse, the Jewish ghetto of Frankfurt, Holy Roman Empire (now Germany), one of eight children of Amschel Moses Rothschild (d. 1755) and his wife, Schönche Rothschild (née Lechnich; d. 1756).

The ancestry of the Rothschilds can be traced back to 1577 to Izaak Elchanan Rothschild (Isaac (Isaak) Elchanan Bacharach, zum Hahn), whose name is derived from the German zum rothen Schild (with the old spelling "th"), meaning "with the red shield", in reference to the house where the family lived for many generations (At the time, houses were designated by signs with different symbols or colors, not numbers.). The name "Rothschild" in Yiddish means red coat, in reference to a heraldic coat of arms. His grandchildren and descendants took this name as the family name and kept it when they relocated in 1664 to another house in the Judengasse— ("[house in] the back of the saucepan") — which became the family's home and place of business through to the early 19th century.

Amschel's father had a business in goods-trading and currency exchange. He was a personal supplier of coins to the Prince of Hesse.

Business career

With the help of relatives, Rothschild secured an apprenticeship under Jacob Wolf Oppenheimer at the banking firm of Simon Wolf Oppenheimer in Hanover in 1757. The grandson of Samuel Oppenheimer taught Rothschild useful knowledge in foreign trade and currency exchange, before he returned to his brothers' business in Frankfurt in 1763. Rothschild said "Give me control of a nation's money supply, and I care not who makes its laws."

He became a dealer in rare coins and won the patronage of Crown Prince Wilhelm of Hesse (who had also earlier patronised his father), gaining the title of "Court Factor" in 1769. Rothschild's coin business grew to include a number of princely patrons, and then expanded through the provision of banking services to Crown Prince Wilhelm, who became Wilhelm IX, Landgrave of Hesse-Kassel in 1785. Business expanded rapidly following the French Revolution when Rothschild handled payments from Britain for the hire of Hessian mercenaries.

By the early years of the 19th century, Rothschild had consolidated his position as principal international banker to Wilhelm IX and began to issue his own international loans, borrowing capital from the Landgrave.

In 1806, Napoleon invaded Hesse in response to Wilhelm's support for Prussia. The Landgrave went into exile in the Duchy of Holstein, but Rothschild was able to continue as his banker, investing funds in London. He also profited from importing goods in circumvention of Napoleon's continental blockade.

Rothschild dynasty
In 1798, third-born son Nathan Mayer Rothschild was sent to England to further the family interests in textile importing with £20,000 capital (equivalent of £ million in )—the first foreign branch. Nathan became a naturalized citizen in 1804 and established a bank in the City of London. In 1810, Mayer entered into a formal partnership agreement with his three eldest sons.

In 1811, the Grand Duke of Frankfurt  enacted a special law "decreeing that all Jews living in Frankfurt, together with their descendants, should enjoy civil rights and privileges equally with other citizens." In exchange for these newfound liberties the Jews had to pay him 440,000 florins, financed by Mayer Amschel Rothschild (at a substantial profit). A number of Masonic Jews at the time also petitioned the Grand Duke for the "exclusive right to maintain lodges in the city", which was granted.

The youngest son of Mayer Amschel, Jacob, was sent to Paris the same year, in 1811, enhancing the family's ability to operate across Europe. This enabled them to profit from the opportunity of financing Wellington's armies in Portugal, requiring the sourcing of large quantities of gold on behalf of the British government.

Rothschild died on 19 September 1812 in Frankfurt am Main. He was buried at the old Jewish cemetery in Frankfurt, located next to the Judengasse. His grave still exists. A park was named after him, and also a street (Rothschildallee). In 1817, he was posthumously ennobled by the emperor Francis I of Austria. 

His descendants furthered the family fortune across Europe—the "five arrows" of banking. Eldest son Amschel Mayer took over the Frankfurt bank and Salomon moved to Vienna. Nathan turned the London branch into one of Europe's most powerful banking institutions (N. M. Rothschild & Sons), Calmann (gentrified to "Carl") set up a branch in Naples and Jacob ("James") opened de Rothschild Frères, becoming a giant of finance in Paris.

Family

Mayer Amschel Rothschild married Guttle Schnapper (1753–1849), the daughter of Wolf Salomon Schnapper, on 29 August 1770.
Schönche Jeannette Rothschild (1771–1859), married to Benedikt Moses Worms (1772–1824)
Amschel "Anselm" Mayer Rothschild (1773–1855)
Salomon Mayer Rothschild (1774–1855), married to Caroline Stern
 See Rothschild banking family of Austria
Nathan Mayer Rothschild (1777–1836), married to Hannah Barent Cohen (1783–1850), daughter of Levi Barent Cohen
 See Rothschild banking family of England
Isabella Rothschild (1781–1861), married to Bernhard Juda Sichel (1780–1862)
Calmann "Carl" Mayer Rothschild (1788–1855), married to Adelheid Herz (1800–1853)
 See Rothschild banking family of Naples
Julie Rothschild (1790–1815), married to Mayer Levin Beyfus (1790–1860)
Henriette "Jette" Rothschild (1791–1866) married to Abraham Montefiore (1788–1824) and mother of Charlotte Montefiore (1818-1854)
 Jacob "James" Mayer de Rothschild (1792–1868), married to Betty de Rothschild (1805–1886), daughter of Salomon Mayer Rothschild
 See Rothschild banking family of France

References

Sources

Further reading

Ferguson, Niall (1998). The House of Rothschild. Volume I: Money's Prophets: 1798–1848. New York, N.Y. USA. Viking.

External links

Rothschild Archive

1744 births
1812 deaths
18th-century German businesspeople
19th-century German businesspeople
German bankers
German Orthodox Jews
18th-century German Jews
Mayer Amschel Rothschild
Mayer Amschel
18th-century businesspeople of the Holy Roman Empire
Jewish bankers